The Crarae Reservoir  is located 2.5 kilometres north west of the village of Crarae, on the west side of Loch Fyne. The concrete dam is 13.7 metres high.

See also
 List of reservoirs and dams in the United Kingdom

Sources
"Argyll and Bute Council Reservoirs Act 1975 Public Register"

Reservoirs in Argyll and Bute